George Downs may refer to:
 George Downs (umpire) (1856–1936), Australian Test cricket umpire
 George W. Downs (physicist), co-founder of Applied Physics Corporation (aka Cary Instruments)
 George W. Downs (political scientist) (1946–2015), American political scientist